Chthamalus dentatus, the tooth barnacle, is a species of star barnacle in the family Chthamalidae.

References

External links

 

Sessilia
Crustaceans described in 1848